Tan Eng Goan, 1st Majoor der Chinezen (1802 – 17 September 1872) was a high-ranking bureaucrat who served as the first Majoor der Chinezen of Batavia (now Jakarta), capital of colonial Indonesia. This was the highest-ranking Chinese position in the civil administration of the Dutch East Indies.

Life

Background and early career

Born in 1802, Majoor Tan Eng Goan came from an old family of the Cabang Atas aristocracy of colonial Indonesia. Many members of his family served as Chinese officers, part of the civil administration of the Dutch colonial government. Both Tan's father and uncle thus served as Chinese headmen and presided over the Chinese Council of Batavia.

Tan was married at least four times, including to his first wife, Lie Pien Nio, a niece of Lie Tieuw Kong, who had succeeded Tan's father and uncle as Kapitein and chairman of the Chinese Council. Tan's uncle-in-law held office from 1812 until 1821.

As the issue of Chinese officers, Tan Eng Goan bore the hereditary title 'Sia' from birth until his elevation to the rank of a Luitenant on 15 February 1827. This promotion was made by Léonard Pierre Joseph, Viscount du Bus de Gisignies, the recently-appointed 8th Governor-General of the Dutch East Indies; and was duly noted in a sitting of the Chinese Council on 9 March 1827.

Captaincy and Mayoralty

In 1829, when the presiding Chinese headman Ko Tiang Tjong was forced to resign from the post of Kapitein der Chinezen of Batavia, Tan - despite only having held the briefest tenure of all sitting officers - was appointed to the Chinese Captaincy. In so doing, he became the head of the Chinese community in Batavia in succession to his father, uncle and uncle-in-law. At that time in Batavia, the post of Kapitein der Chinezen was the highest-ranking Chinese position in the colonial administration.

On 21 September 1837, Kapitein Tan Eng Goan was further raised to the newly created post of Majoor der Chinezen of Batavia by Dominique Jacques de Eerens, the 11th Governor-General. Tan's two Luitenants, Oey Eng Liok and Jap Soan Kong, were both elevated a year later to the higher rank of Kapitein. As Kapitein, then as Majoor, Tan was also the ex officio Chairman of the Chinese Council of Batavia (Dutch: Chinese Raad; Malay: Kong Koan), the highest Chinese governmental body in the colony.

The Majoor's family owned the particuliere landen or private domains of Kramat, Kapoek, Tandjoeng Boeroeng and Rawa Kidang in Tangerang. From 1848 until 1862, Majoor Tan Eng Goan also held a series of pachts or revenue farms over such diverse things as arak, rum, tobacco and wayang. Despite his landed wealth and revenue farms, Tan's income fell short of the exalted style of living expected of a Chinese officer.

Tenure as Majoor and Kapitein

In the late 1820s, Kapitein Tan Eng Goan initiated an annual pasar malam, or night market, held in Batavia three days prior to Lunar New Year. This was among the earliest and biggest of Batavia's organized night markets, and served as a prototype for similar and later markets elsewhere.

Tan's tenure as a Chinese officer was affected by his declining family finances, which forced him to patronise Batavia's foremost tobacco magnate, Oey Thai Lo. In return for Oey's financial support, Tan recommended the nouveau riche Oey for an elevation to the purely honorary rank of Luitenant-titulair der Chinezen, which gave the tobacco tycoon the respectability he craved.

Tan's debt and financial reliance on Oey, however, prevented him from acting with authority when restraining the wayward and disrespectful behaviour of the latter' son, the notorious playboy Oey Tamba Sia (1827-1856). Oey Tamba Sia eventually developed an intense rivalry with the Majoor's son-in-law, Lim Soe Keng Sia, with eventually murderous consequences.

The younger Oey masterminded a series of murders, and unsuccessfully attempted to implicate Lim in these crimes. Although Lim was acquitted, his rival Oey - a wealthy member of the city's Chinese establishment - was found guilty and executed by public hanging in 1856. The scandal severely damaged the standing and authority of the Majoor in the eyes of the Chinese community. Even Tan's immediate subordinates in the Chinese Council, notably Kapitein Tan Tjoen Tiat and Luitenant The Kim Houw, were disappointed in the Majoor's meek handling of the case of Oey Tamba Sia.

The Majoor's financial situation further deteriorated after the Oey case, which led him to sell the estates of Kramat and Kapoek in the 1860s to his eventual successor, Kapitein Tan Tjoen Tiat.

Resignation and death

Majoor Tan Eng Goan served in office until 1865, when, due to his old age and fragile health, he requested and was granted an honourable discharge from his duties by the colonial authorities. He also attempted without success to secure the succession of his adoptive son, Kapitein Tan Soe Tjong, to the Chinese Mayoralty.

The former Majoor was allowed to retain his title on an honorary basis following his resignation. Given Tan's long service and precarious finances, the colonial government further awarded him a pension of 150 guilders per month.

Majoor Tan Eng Goan died on 17 September 1872 in Patoakan, Batavia, and was buried in Slipi. His adoptive son, Kapitein Tan Soe Tjong had predeceased him the previous year, on 20 June 1871. Majoor Tan Eng Goan also had a daughter, Tan Bit Nio, who was married to Lim Soe Keng Sia. Through them, the Majoor was a grandfather of Lim Hong Nio and a great-grandfather of the prominent landlord and community leader Tan Liok Tiauw (1872 - 1947).

Significance
Tan is remembered today as the first sitting Majoor der Chinezen of Batavia, arguably the most important Chinese officership in colonial Indonesia. In office for some 37 years as Kapitein, then Majoor, Tan was also the longest-serving head of the Chinese Council and of the Chinese community of Batavia.

Majoor Tan Eng Goan is also remembered today for his poor handling of the case of Oey Tamba Sia.

As recently as 2013, the saga of the Majoor, his son-in-law and their rivalry with Oey provided part of the inspiration for Atilah Soeryadjaya's musical, Ariah.

References

External links
 

1802 births
1872 deaths
People from Batavia, Dutch East Indies
People of the Dutch East Indies
Indonesian people of Chinese descent
Indonesian Hokkien people
Kapitan Cina in Indonesia
Sia (title)